is an athletic stadium in Hibiya Park, Chiyoda, Tokyo, Japan.

It hosted the 1921 Emperor's Cup and final game between Tokyo Shukyu-Dan and Mikage Shukyu-Dan was played there on November 27, 1921.

External links
Hibiya Park official site

Sports venues in Tokyo
Football venues in Japan